Hermilando Ingco Mandanas (born March 25, 1944), also known as Dodo Mandanas and colloquially as Dodo, is a Filipino politician who served as Governor of Batangas since 2016; previously served this position from 1995 until 2004. He served as a Member of the House of Representatives of the Philippines, representing the 2nd District of Batangas from 2004 until 2013.

Early life and education
Hermilando Ingco Mandanas was born on March 25, 1944 in Bauan, Batangas. He finished his Bachelor of Science in Commerce degree as consistent dean's lister – first honor at De La Salle University. He then became a university scholar at the University of the Philippines and studied for his master's degree in business administration, where he graduated honor roll. He obtained his honorary degree (honoris causa) as doctorate in humanities at Batangas State University.  
 
He also served as chairman of Department of Accountancy (1968–1969), associate dean of School of Commerce (1967–1969) and a member of the board of trustees (1979–1985) in the De La Salle University.

Career

Private Sector
Mandanas started out by working for different companies. He was a supervisor of the Carlos J. Valdes & Co. from 1963 to 1965. He then served as an executive assistant to the president of the Far East Bank and Trust Company. In 1972, he was the president of the Fereit Realty Development Corporation until 1975 and as the Philippine Commercial Delegate of the Banque Francaise Du Commerce Exterior from 1975 to 1978. Then he became the managing director of the Manila & Hong Kong Capital Corporation from 1980 until 1987.

He also served as the director for: Alpa Asia Hotels & Resorts Incorporated; United States Capital Corporation; Philippines-China Development Corporation; Oriental Pacific Equities (Hong Kong); Manila Taiwan Development Corporation; Apex Mining and Exploration Company and Rural Bank of Batangas.

From 1987 to 1995? he also was the chairperson and president of the: Omnivest; Hedge Issues Management; Abacus Consolidated Holdings; Suricon Resources Corp.; and HIM Management Corp.

Government Sector
After the issuance of the Presidential Decree No. 1396, Mandanas served as the 1st general manager of the Human Settlements Development Corporation under former president Ferdinand Marcos.

From 1995 to 2004, he served as Governor of the Province of Batangas and concurrently became president of Federation of Regional Development Council of the Philippines. He also served as chairman of the Regional Development Council (Region IV-A, Southern Tagalog) from 1995 to 2004, Regional Peace and Order Council (Region IV-A) from 1995 to 2001 and from 2003 to 2004 and CALABARZON Coordinating Council (Cavite, Laguna, Batangas, Rizal, Quezon) from 2001 to 2004.

Committee membership
 Ways and Means – former chairman
 Economic Affairs – vice-chairperson
 Banks and Financial Intermediaries – member for the majority
 Bases Conversion – member for the majority
 East ASEAN Growth Area – member for the majority
 Energy – member for the majority
 Foreign Affairs – member for the majority
 Globalization and WTO – member for the majority
 Government Enterprises and Privatization – member for the majority
 Justice – deputized member
 Millennium Development Goals – member for the majority
 National Defense and Security – member for the majority
 Trade and Industry – member for the majority

Congressional Oversight Committees
 Comprehensive Tax Reform Program – former chairman
 Physical Examination of Imported Articles – former chairman
 Official Development Assistance – former chairman
 Safeguard Measures Act – former member

Awards/citations received 
 Philconsa's Medal of Wisdom and Courage Awardee, Phil. Constitution Association, February 8, 2012 (Constitution Day)
 2006 Dangal Ng Pilipinas Awardee, Consumers Union of the Philippines
 2005 Regional Kabalikat Awardee, Technical Education & Skills Development Authority
 2004, 2005, 2006, 2007, 2008, 2009, Most Outstanding Congressman, Makati Graduate School, Congress Magazine, MV Gallego Foundation
 2004 Outstanding Public Official, Consumer's Union of the Philippines, 15th Annual National Consumers Award
 Outstanding Governor Award, 2nd Local Government Leadership Award, Senate, Republic of the Philippines, 2002 and 2003
 Gawad Parangal Awardee, Most Outstanding Provincial Governor, 7th National Social Welfare and Development Forum, October 2003
 2002 Provincial Nutrition Green Banner Awardee, In the Calabarzon Region, National Nutrition Council, September 2003
 Most outstanding Governor of the Philippines, Awarded by PNP Maritime, 2002*
 Kabalikat Awards 2000, Tesda
 Most Outstanding Governor of Calabarzon, Leader Magazine, July 9, 2000

Achievements 
 The first governor to give honorarium to Barangay Health Workers, Barangay Nutrition's Scholars, Barangay Service Point Officers, Barangay Tanod etc.
 He was also the first to give PhilHealth benefits to Barangay Health Workers, Barangay Nutrition's Scholars, Barangay Service Point Officers, Barangay Tanod.
 He was also the first to grant scholarships to deserving students.

References
 

|-

|-

Living people
1944 births
Governors of Batangas
Members of the House of Representatives of the Philippines from Batangas
Liberal Party (Philippines) politicians
De La Salle University alumni
University of the Philippines alumni
People from Batangas
PDP–Laban politicians
United Nationalist Alliance politicians